The Vlorë Wind Farm is a wind farm in Albania. It has 250 individual wind turbines with a nominal output of around 2 MW each, which deliver up to 500 MW of power.

References

External links

Albania to Build Major Wind Farm
Vlorë windfarm, Albania

Wind farms in Albania
Buildings and structures in Vlorë